is a tumbling micro-asteroid classified as a bright near-Earth object of the Apollo group, approximately  in diameter. It was first observed by Pan-STARRS at Haleakala Observatory on the Hawaiian island of Maui, in the United States. The asteroid was removed from the Sentry Risk Table on 16 October 2017 and with a 5-year observation arc has a well-known orbit.

Approaches to large bodies 
Orbital modeling shows the asteroid nominally passed about 1 million km from Earth in October 1986, but the uncertainty region suggests it could have passed as close as 20 km.

Data from JPL 60 solution date 3 November 2017

2012 Earth encounter 

It came within 0.000634 AU (0.247 LD, 94,800 km, 58,900 mi) from Earth on 12 October 2012.

During the 2012 close approach, the asteroid only had an observation arc of 7 days, between 4 and 11 October 2012, so the exact distance of the 2017 closest approach was poorly constrained. With the 7 day observation arc, the asteroid had a 3-sigma chance of passing between 0.00008818 and 0.002896 AU (0.034 to 1.127 LD, 13,200–433,200 km, 8,200–269,200 mi) from Earth on 12 October 2017. Astronomers were certain that it would not pass closer than 6,800 km from the surface of Earth, ruling out any possibility that it could hit the Earth in 2017.

2017 Earth encounter 

On 12 October 2017 at 5:42 UT, the asteroid passed  from Earth. Observations between July and October reduced the uncertainty region from several hundred thousand kilometers to about ±140 meters. The asteroid was removed from the Sentry Risk Table on 16 October 2017 using JPL solution #56. Prior to the encounter, it was rated −4.11 on the Palermo scale, with a 1 in 1,000 chance of impact over the next hundred years.

Paul Chodas of NASA's Center for near-Earth Object Studies, and Vishnu Reddy of the University of Arizona's Lunar and Planetary Laboratory, viewed the 2017 flyby (inside of the orbit of the Moon) as a way to test and refine the global asteroid detection and tracking network designed to give warning of objects heading toward Earth. Reddy coordinated the effort, involving over a dozen institutions worldwide. In addition to the observation campaign, NASA used this exercise to test communications between the many observers and also to test internal U.S. government messaging and communications up through the executive branch and across government agencies, as it would during an actual predicted impact emergency. Results of the campaign were published on 3 November 2017.

As such,  has become the first known asteroid ever to be observed passing less than 1 Lunar distance from Earth twice in a row. At the time of recovery the asteroid was about 100 million times fainter than what can be seen with the naked eye and 500 times fainter than when it was discovered in 2012. As a result of the 2017 recovery observations, it was known that on 12 October 2017 at 5:42 UT, the asteroid would pass  from Earth. Then at 19:19 UT, the asteroid would pass  from the Moon.  peaked at about apparent magnitude 12.9, and was too faint to be seen without a telescope. The Earth approach of 2017 increased the asteroid's orbital period from 1.67 years to 2.06 years.

 reached a maximum apparent magnitude of 12.9 just prior to its closest approach, soon after which it came too close to the Sun to be seen with telescopes. It was last observed on 14 December 2017 at an apparent magnitude of 25,

Physical properties

Fast rotator and tumbler 
Studies of the asteroid's light curve in October 2012, found it to have a rotation period of 0.2038 hours (or 12 minutes and 14 seconds) with a brightness variation of 0.93 magnitude, which is indicative for a non-spherical shape.  is a fast rotator, which is rather typical for its small size. The fastest rotator currently known is 2014 RC, a similarly sized NEO, with a period of only 16 seconds.
Lightcurves obtained during the 2017 encounter confirmed that  is in a non-principal axis rotation, commonly known as tumbling. The spin axis varies on timescales of minutes, with a second period of 0.142 hours (or 8.5 minutes). The lightcurve amplitude suggests a ratio of largest to smallest axis of at least 2.3.

Radar observations 
Radar images were taken from Goldstone Observatory and Green Bank Telescope on 12 October 2017. The delay-doppler images had a range resolution of 1.9 meters/pixel, the highest resolution ever obtained using Goldstone transmissions. The images showed that  was a very elongated object about 50 feet (15 meters) long and roughly 25 feet (8 meters) wide. Observations from Arecibo Observatory were planned, but had to be cancelled due to damage to the observatory as a result of Hurricane Maria.

Composition 
E-type asteroids tend to have a high albedo (>0.30). This type of asteroids is commonly found in the inner Main Belt.

 is composed of igneous material. The short rotation period of  implies that it is not a rubble pile but rather a monolithic object of non-negligible strength, which is typical for very small asteroids.

Orbit change 
As a result of 's frequent approaches to Earth, its orbit changes significantly over short periods of only decades. Its two observed close approaches and their effects are shown below:

Between 2012 and 2017, 's average distance from the sun increased by almost 0.4 AU, with the time it takes to orbit the sun increasing by 250 days. Its closest approach to the Sun also increased significantly, from 90% of the Earth's distance to the Sun to 97%, and its inclination lowered slightly, going from 1.4 degrees to less than 0.5 degrees relative to Earth's orbit.

As a result of non-gravitational forces such as the Yarkovsky effect on small bodies, it is difficult to constrain its orbit more than a few decades into the past or future.

See also 
 List of asteroid close approaches to Earth
 List of asteroid close approaches to Earth in 2012
 List of asteroid close approaches to Earth in 2017
 NASA Planetary Defense Coordination Office

Notes

References

External links 
 Interesting Asteroids Past Earth Close encounters — Sormano Astronomical Observatory
 Image and animation of 2012 TC4 Virtual Telescope Project
 Asteroid 2012 TC4 On Track For Close Earth Flyby AstroBob 10/3/17
 Asteroid 2012 TC4: House-Sized Asteroid Almost Hits Earth (PHOTO, VIDEO) 13 October 2012
 2012 TC4 orbit and observations, Minor Planet Center
 
 
 

Minor planet object articles (unnumbered)

20121012
20171012
20121004